The University of Trieste (or UniTS) is a public research university in Trieste in the Friuli-Venezia Giulia region in northeast Italy. The university consists of 10 departments, boasts a wide and almost complete range of university courses and has about 15,000 students and 1,000 professors. It was founded in 1924.

The historical international vocation of the University of Trieste is witnessed by its intense and high-level activity: Trieste is the centre of many research facilities, with which the university is connected by cooperation agreements. Among them, there are the International School for Advanced Studies, the International Centre for Theoretical Physics, the National Institute of Oceanography, the International Centre for Genetic Engineering and Biotechnology, the Elettra Sincrotrone Trieste Facility, the Trieste sections of the Italian National Institute for Nuclear Physics (INFN) and Italian National Institute for Astrophysics (INAF), and many others, building up the so-called "sistema Trieste" (Trieste System).

Moreover, the number of international inter-university co-operation agreements rapidly increased these last years. These agreements involve staff and student mobility, both within EU Programmes like the Socrates programme and agreements exclusively concerned with research activities.

The 2014 Times Higher Education World University Rankings ranked it second among Italian universities. In 2019, U.S. News & World Report placed it at #67 among the top 100 universities in the world for Space Science. In the 2018 Round University Ranking of world universities, it stands at #99 for Life Sciences in the world.

History

Before World War I, when Trieste was still a part of the Austro-Hungarian Empire, the Italian-speaking population strongly supported the idea of building a university in the town, but Austrian authorities repeatedly rejected the proposal. After the annexation of Trieste to Italy, the already existing Superior School in Commerce was granted the same rights of similar schools in Italy, and in 1924 it was turned into a university, by king's decree (8 August 1924, n. 1338). In 1938, with the institution of the Law faculty, the second after the Economy and Commerce faculty, the university became a Studium Generale (General Studies) one, and thus was given the title of Regia Università degli Studi (King's University). In the same year, the construction of a new building to house the faculties began on the Scoglietto hill, in a position dominating the Old City. The building, which still hosts the directive board and some faculties, was designed by architects Raffaello Fagnoni and Umberto Nordio. The first stone was posed in a ceremony on 19 September 1938 in the presence of the Italian Prime Minister and other authorities.

World War II slowed down the planned enlargement of the university. Indeed, the faculty of Engineering, although established in 1942, was restricted to naval engineering until the end of the war, while the opening of the faculty of Literature and philosophy, planned in 1943, was postponed till 1945. After the war, Trieste was put under the joint control of the United Kingdom and the United States of America, in preparation for the establishment of a fully independent State, the Free Territory of Trieste, which nevertheless never came to exist. The Allied Government allowed the foundation of the new Literature and Philosophy faculty, instituted the faculty of Mathematical, Physical and Natural Sciences, and completed the construction of the main building on the Scoglietto hill, inviting an emissary of the Italian government to the inauguration ceremony.

In 1954 Trieste was given back to Italy thanks to an agreement between the American and the Italian governments. To celebrate, the university awarded the President of the Italian Republic Luigi Einaudi a honoris causa degree in Economy and Commerce. In a short time new faculties were added (Pharmacy, Teaching Sciences, Medicine and Surgery, Political Sciences), while also new buildings were inaugurated on the Scoglietto hill and in other parts of the town. In 1978 the School of Modern Languages for Interpreters and Translators was given the status of faculty; in 1997 the faculty of Psychology and in 1998 the faculty of Architecture completed the range of faculties currently present at the university.

Organization

These are the 10 departments into which the university is divided on the basis of the major reorganisation of the university's academic structure which took place in 2010:

 Clinical Department of Medical, Surgical and Health Sciences
 Department of Physics
 Department of Engineering and Architecture
 Department of Mathematics and Geosciences
 Department of Chemical and Pharmaceutical Sciences
 Department of Life Sciences
 Department of Economic, Business, Mathematical and Statistical Sciences
 Department of Legal, Language, Interpreting and Translation Studies
 Department of Political and Social Sciences
 Department of Humanities

A Language Centre was established as an independent service on 1 January 2003. The centre provides fundamental support in the following areas: organisation and running of taught language courses in all the Faculties of Trieste University; organisation of Italian courses (beginner, intermediate and advanced level) for Erasmus students both going abroad and coming to Trieste.

Structures

The main campus is centered on the building in Piazzale Europa, on the Scoglietto hill, housing the Rector's office, the Administration offices, the Main Library and the faculties of Law and Political Sciences. Other buildings in the campus host the faculties of Economics, Pharmacy, Mathematical, Physical and Natural Sciences, Engineering, the Medical Institutes of Microbiology and Physiology, the towing tank, the Data Processing Centre, the Department of Chemical Sciences and the Department of Biochemistry, Biophysics and Macromolecular Chemistry. Within the premises are also sited the university canteen and three university dorms, run by the ARDISS - Agenzia Regionale per il Diritto agli Studi Superiori (Regional Agency for the Right to Higher Education).

Other departments are located in different parts of the town. The Department of Geological Sciences and the Department of Earth Sciences are accommodated in the buildings of the former psychiatric hospital, not far away from the main campus, inside San Giovanni Park.

In the heart of the city near the seafront, the old buildings of Via dell'Università and Via del Lazzaretto vecchio house the Department of Humanities, while the Narodni Dom* houses the Section of Studies in Modern Languages for Interpreting and Translation, the first advanced school of for interpreters and translators in Italy. *Restitution to the Slovenian community of Trieste in 2020.

The Faculty of Medicine and Surgery is located in several university compounds, particularly in structures annexed to the three town hospitals: Cattinara, Trieste General Hospital (Ospedale Maggiore), and Burlo Garofolo.

Far from the city centre, near the ICTP (International Centre for Theoretical Physics) there is the Department of Theoretical Physics, in the village of Miramare-Grignano, while the Department of Astronomy is housed near Trieste's two Astronomical Observatories: on San Vito hill and on the karst plateau, in Basovizza.

A few faculties are not in Trieste, but in other cities of the Friuli Venezia Giulia region and in the neighboring Veneto region. Particularly, in the Pordenone campus, there are undergraduate and graduate programs in Engineering and Education, while the Gorizia campus offers undergraduate and graduate degree programs in International and Diplomatic Studies (part of the Faculty of Political Sciences) and three first-level degree: Business communication and human resource management, Economics and tourism management, Territorial policy. Finally, the Portogruaro campus in the Veneto region hosts the Teaching Sciences Department.

Orto Botanico dell'Università di Trieste (Botanical Garden of the University of Trieste)
Orto Botanico dell'Università di Trieste (4.2 hectares) is maintained by University of Trieste. Founded in 1963, the Botanical Garden of the University of Trieste has an extension of about 2 square kilo meters plus two more woods on Mount Valerio.

Points of interest 
 Orto Botanico dell'Università di Trieste, a botanical garden
 Radioincorso.it, a university web radio

Notable people

Notable faculty
 Luisa Accati, Sociology
 Stefano Bartolini, Political Science
 Václav Bělohradský, Philosophy
 Darko Bratina, Sociology 
 Eugenio Colorni, Philosophy
 Gillo Dorfles, Humanities
Augusto del Noce, Philosophy 
 Margherita Hack, Astrophysics
 Elvio Guagnini, Italian literature
 Gaetano Kanizsa, Psychology
 Marko Kravos, Slovene language
 Claudio Magris, German literature
 Jože Pirjevec, History
 Dario Stevanato, Tax Law

Notable alumni
 Giovanni Bossi, former CEO, Banca IFIS
 Marino Busdachin, Secretary-General, Unrepresented Nations and Peoples Organization
 Alberto Conti, mathematician
 Luciano Fonda, physicist
 Salvatore Farina, General, Chief of Army Staff, Commander, Allied Joint Force Command Brunssum
 Roberto Fico, President, Italian Chamber of Deputies
 Dario Floreano, computer scientist
 Antonio Giordano, physician
 Albert O. Hirschman, economist
 Andrea Illy, entrepreneur
 Dušan Jelinčič, journalist and novelist
 Clara Lovett, President (1993-2001), Northern Arizona University 
 Fabio Mini, General (Ret'd) Army, author, columnist
 Stefano Patuanelli, politician, Minister of Economic development
 Carlo Pelanda, economist
 Jože Pirjevec, historian
 Alenka Rebula Tuta, poet and author
 Ermin Smrekar, architect
 Marta Verginella, historian
 Luca Visentini, Secretary-General, European Trade Union Confederation (ETUC)
 Demetrio Volcic, journalist 
 Lamberto Zannier, diplomat

Publications 
Since 1999 the university's department of philosophy has published the journal Ethics & Politics [Etica & Politica] .

See also 
 List of Italian universities
 List of modern universities in Europe (1801–1945)
 International School for Advanced Studies

References

External links

 University of Trieste Website 
 University of Trieste Foreign Students 
 University of Trieste International Relations 
 University of Trieste Socrates Programme 
 University of Trieste Language Centre 

 
University of Trieste
Educational institutions established in 1924
Education in Friuli-Venezia Giulia
1924 establishments in Italy